Brown Peak is a stratovolcano and the highest point of the Balleny Islands. It is situated on the northern part of Sturge Island.

Discovery and naming
John Balleny discovered Brown Peak in February 1839, and named it for W. Brown, a merchant who provided financial support to the Enderby Brothers' expedition. In 1841, Captain James Clark Ross, who sighted the islands on his own expedition to Antarctica, gave it the name Russell Peak.

Possible 2001 eruption

Satellite imagery suggests that an eruption may have occurred on or about 12 June 2001.

See also
 List of volcanoes in Antarctica

References

Bibliography

External links
 
 

Volcanoes of the Balleny Islands
Mountains of New Zealand
Stratovolcanoes of New Zealand